Sela is a small settlement west of Bela Cerkev in the Municipality of Šmarješke Toplice in southeastern Slovenia. The area is part of the historical region of Lower Carniola. The municipality is now included in the Southeast Slovenia Statistical Region.

References

External links
Sela at Geopedia

Populated places in the Municipality of Šmarješke Toplice